Alexandra Fedotovna Rzevskaya, née Kamenskaya (1740–1769) was a Russian writer and amateur artist.

Daughter of General Fedota Mikhailovich Kamensky, she grew up on the family estate at Kamensky Saburov, near Oryol, where she learned French, Italian, painting, and music. She published poetry and an epistolary novel. Her husband, whom she married in 1766, was the poet Alexei Rzhevsky; she died in childbirth three years after they wed.

References

1740 births
1769 deaths
Women writers from the Russian Empire
Russian women novelists
Russian women poets
Russian women painters
18th-century poets from the Russian Empire
18th-century novelists from the Russian Empire
18th-century painters from the Russian Empire
18th-century women writers from the Russian Empire
18th-century women artists
Pastel artists
Burials at Lazarevskoe Cemetery (Saint Petersburg)